Chrosiothes niteroi is a species of comb-footed spider in the family Theridiidae. It is found in Bolivia, Brazil, and Argentina.

References

Theridiidae
Spiders described in 1964